Maasia is a genus of flowering plants belonging to the family Annonaceae.

Its native range is Indo-China to New Guinea. It is found in Andaman Islands, Borneo, Java, Malaya, Maluku Islands, Myanmar, Nicobar Islands, Philippines, Sulawesi, Sumatera and Thailand.

The genus name of Maasia is in honour of Paul Maas (born 1939), a botanist from the Netherlands and a specialist in the flora of the neotropics. 
It was first described and published in Syst. Bot. Vol. 33 on page 493 in 2008.

Species
According to Kew:
Maasia discolor 
Maasia glauca 
Maasia hypoleuca 
Maasia multinervis 
Maasia ovalifolia 
Maasia sumatrana

References

Annonaceae
Annonaceae genera
Plants described in 2008
Flora of Indo-China
Flora of Malesia
Flora of New Guinea